Here are the results for USA Masters diving meets from 2010 to 2019.

Return to USA Masters Diving

Diving competitions in the United States